The 2016 Good Sam 500 was a NASCAR Sprint Cup Series race held on March 13, 2016, at Phoenix International Raceway in Avondale, Arizona. Contested over 313 laps, extended from 312 laps due to overtime, on the  asphalt oval, it was the fourth race of the 2016 NASCAR Sprint Cup Series season. Kevin Harvick won the race. Carl Edwards finished second. Denny Hamlin, Kyle Busch and Dale Earnhardt Jr. rounded out the top–five.

Busch won the pole for the race and led 75 laps on his way to a fourth-place finish. Harvick led a race high of 139 laps on his way to winning the race. There were seven lead changes among four different drivers, as well as five caution flag periods for 30 laps.

This was Harvick's 32nd career victory, first of the season, eighth at Phoenix International Raceway and fifth at the track for Stewart-Haas Racing. With the win, he moved up to first in the points standings. Chevrolet moved to first in the manufacturer standings.

The Good Sam 500 was carried by Fox Sports on the broadcast Fox network for the American television audience. The radio broadcast for the race was carried by the Motor Racing Network and Sirius XM NASCAR Radio.

Report

Background

Phoenix International Raceway, also known as PIR, is a one-mile, low-banked tri-oval race track located in Avondale, Arizona. The motorsport track opened in 1964 and currently hosts two NASCAR race weekends annually. PIR has also hosted the IndyCar Series, CART, USAC and the Rolex Sports Car Series. The raceway is currently owned and operated by International Speedway Corporation.

Entry list
The entry list for the Good Sam 500 was released on Monday, March 7 at 9:11 a.m. Eastern time. Thirty-nine cars are entered for the race. The only driver changes for this weekend's race were Ty Dillon returning to the seat of the No. 14 Stewart-Haas Racing Chevrolet and Joey Gase taking over the No. 32 Go FAS Racing Ford.

First practice

Qualifying

He said afterwards that he "cooled everything back down to make sure we gave it everything we got. We just made a couple of fine-tuning adjustments from what we ran before and it was a tick faster, not much, just a tick.” Jimmie Johnson and Kasey Kahne will both go to backup cars after mishaps in qualifying with the former crashing out and the latter changing engines. Johnson said after being released from the infield care center that the car was "a lot of straight in an area of the track that I didn't need to have straight. We'll have to get to the bottom of it. Just a really hard impact to the outside wall. Thankful that we have SAFER barriers and soft walls. But very disappointed because we had such a fast race car." He later took to Twitter to say that the wreck was because his steering wheel came off.

Qualifying results

Practice (post-qualifying)

Second practice
During the session, Michael Annett suffered a front-end lockup and slammed the wall in turn 1. Because this required him to go to a backup car, he'll start from the rear of the field. He said that "the car just didn’t want to turn. I don’t know if we were on the splitter or if we cut down a right-front (tire). … I cranked on the wheel and it wouldn’t go straight.”

Final practice

Race

First half

Start

Under clear blue Arizona skies, Kyle Busch led the field to the green flag at 3:49 p.m. After 10 laps, he pulled to a one-second lead over teammate Carl Edwards. The first caution of the race flew on lap 52 for a single-car wreck in turn 3. Going into the turn, Ryan Newman suffered a right-front tire blowout and slammed the wall. He would go on to finish last for the first time since 2008. He said he "just blew a right-front tire. It must have melted the bead or something. I don’t know if something failed in the cooling department or what the deal was. I didn’t do anything any different than I’ve ever done here before.  Just definitely blew a right-front tire out and that was the end of our day with the Grainger Chevrolet.” Denny Hamlin was tagged for an uncontrolled tire and restarted the race from the tail-end of the field.

The race restarted on lap 60. Unlike the first run, he didn't pull away from the field. After taking just right-side tires on the first pit stop, he began losing his lead to Dale Earnhardt Jr. who took four. Earnhardt passed him in turn 3 to take the lead on lap 76. The second caution of the race flew on lap 104 for a single-car wreck in turn 3. Going into the turn, Paul Menard suffered a right-front tire blowout and slammed the wall. When asked what happened, he said he wasn't “really sure. We were okay that last run. We fired off pretty decent and started getting really tight at the end. I don’t know if a left-front tire blew or what going into 3. I don’t know if something broke or if a tire blew. We are going to check it out. I’m curious about it.” Edwards exited pit road with the race lead. Brian Scott was tagged for speeding on pit road and restarted the race from the tail-end of the field.

Second quarter
The race restarted on lap 113. After pulling away from the field, Edwards began losing his lead to teammate Kyle Busch. The third caution of the race flew on lap 163 for a single-car wreck in turn 1. Going into turn 1, Ricky Stenhouse Jr. suffered a right-front tire blowout and slammed the wall. He said he was "really tight and I was having to use too much brake and I think we got the tires hot and once we did that the right front gave out from having to use too much brake. The cars were a handful. They were fun to drive. We just didn’t quite have the Fastenal Ford dialed in like we needed to today. We were really tight, therefore, we had to use too much brake.” Kyle Busch exited pit road 18th after overshooting his pit box and stopping too close to the pit wall.

Second half

Halfway
The race restarted at lap 169. Kevin Harvick powered ahead of Edwards on the restart and took the lead. On lap 180, Harvick led his nine-thousandth career lap in Sprint Cup Series competition. Debris on the backstretch brought out the fourth caution of the race with 87 laps to go. The debris came from the shredded right-rear tire of Brad Keselowski's car. Edwards beat Harvick off pit road.

Fourth quarter
The race restarted with 78 laps to go. Harvick had no difficulty retaking the lead from Edwards going into turn 1. Joey Logano pitted from ninth with seven to go because he was short on fuel. The fifth caution of the race flew with six laps to go for a single-car wreck in turn 4. Rounding the turn, Kasey Kahne suffered a right-front tire blowout and slammed the wall. He said he "had a right front tire go down. It happened earlier in the race but a caution came out and I thought it was the engine at the time because of the way it kind of vibrated and changed the tone of the engine. Come to find out it wasn’t the engine and it was the tire. We’ll look at what we are doing since it happened a couple of times. We had a car capable of running in the top-15 and we were really good early. The longer the race went I felt like I got looser. I used a lot of brake during the entire the race, which I was surprised about. Yesterday in practice I didn’t have to use the brake hardly at all and today with different grips I used it so much.” Harvick, Earnhardt and Austin Dillon opted to stay out while the rest of the field opted to pit.

Overtime
The race restarted with two laps to go at an overtime finish,  Harvick led the field to the green with Carl Edwards at his back. After the white flag, Harvick and Edwards battled for the lead, bumping each other until Harvick came out victorious by 0.010 seconds, the closest finish in Phoenix history.

Post-race

Driver comments
Harvick said that he "knew he (Edwards) was better through (Turns) 3 and 4, but that was not the car I wanted to see behind me. I tried to protect the bottom in 3 and 4, and I just missed the bottom with all the rubber built up on the tires. I knew I was going to be on defense down there. I got up too high … and then he got into me, like he should have. I knew I needed to get a good run off the corner and I was going to have to get into his door. And it worked out, just barely.“

Edwards said that Harvick "was pretty fast, even on old tires. Once we got clear, I thought we were going to get one shot. I tried to go to the outside of him and he blocked a little bit, and I didn't have anywhere to go but rub him a little bit." He joked that he "should’ve wrecked him. No, those guys were doing a great job all day. They hung on with those tires but we were faster so I thought, ‘Man, I’ll just move him out of the way and get by.’ I just didn't move him far enough and then he got up the door and I thought I was trying to time—I thought ‘I think he’s going to beat me.’ So, I tried to sideswipe him before he got there but I needed to be in front of his front tire. Anyway, just a fun race.”

Hamlin said he "was actually rooting on Carl going, ‘Get him.’ But, we’ve been on the other side of that photo finish. Awesome that this rules package creates this kind of racing and some of the finishes that we’ve seen so far this year.”

Race results

Race summary
 Lead changes: 7 
 Cautions/Laps: 5 for 30
 Red flags: 0
 Time of race: 2 hours, 45 minutes and 33 seconds
 Average speed:

Media

Television
Fox Sports will be covering their 12th race at the Phoenix International Raceway. Mike Joy, two-time Phoenix winner Jeff Gordon and Darrell Waltrip will have the call in the booth for the race. Jamie Little, Vince Welch and Matt Yocum will handle the pit road duties for the television side.

Radio
MRN will have the radio call for the race which will also be simulcast on Sirius XM NASCAR Radio. Joe Moore, Jeff Striegle and one-time Phoenix winner Rusty Wallace will call the race from the booth when the field is racing down the front stretch. Dave Moody will call the race from atop the stands in turn 1 when the field is racing through turns 1 and 2. Kyle Rickey will call the race from a billboard outside turn 4 when the field is racing through turns 3 and 4. Pit road will be manned by Alex Hayden, Glenn Jarrett and Steve Post.

Standings after the race

Drivers' Championship standings

Manufacturers' Championship standings

Note: Only the first 16 positions are included for the driver standings.

Notes

References

Good Sam 500
Good Sam 500
NASCAR races at Phoenix Raceway
Good Sam 500